Robert Simpson Priddy (born December 10, 1939) is a retired American professional baseball player. He was a right-handed pitcher in Major League Baseball from 1962 to 1971, with the exception of the 1963 season. He was born in Pittsburgh, Pennsylvania.

He played for the Pittsburgh Pirates, San Francisco Giants, Washington Senators, Chicago White Sox, California Angels and Atlanta Braves.

References

External links

Major League Baseball pitchers
Baseball players from Pittsburgh
Pittsburgh Pirates players
San Francisco Giants players
Washington Senators (1961–1971) players
Chicago White Sox players
California Angels players
Atlanta Braves players
Hawaii Islanders players
Living people
1939 births
Roswell Pirates players